This is a list of notable Arab Argentine individuals of Lebanese descent born in Argentina  or people of Lebanese and dual nationality who live or lived in Argentina.

Entertainment 
 Carlos Balá - actor
 Yamila Diaz-Rahi - fashion model
 Zulma Faiad - actress and vedette
 Mario Sapag - comedian and impersonator

Media
 Karen Maron - journalist
 Daniel Hadad - journalist

Military
 Mohamed Alí Seineldín - army colonel

Music
 Jorge Cafrune - folklorist singer
 Alberto Hassan - singer

Politicians
 Alfredo Avelín - politician
 Juliana Awada - first lady, wife of Mauricio Macri
 Soher El Sukaria - member of the Argentine Chamber of Deputies
 Raúl Jalil - governor of Catamarca Province
 Juan Luis Manzur - surgeon and politician, former health minister, governor of Tucumán Province and cabinet chief
 Jorge Obeid - governor of Santa Fe Province
 Alma Sapag - member of the Argentine Chamber of Deputies
 Elías Sapag - former federal senator of Neuquén Province
 Felipe Sapag - former governor of Neuquén Province
 Jorge Sapag - former governor Neuquén Province
 Luz Sapag - former federal senator of Neuquén Province and former mayor of San Martín de los Andes

Religion
 Lucía Caram - nun and writer

Sports
 Antonio Alegre - football official
 Julio Asad - soccer player
 Omar Asad - soccer team manager
 Elias Bazzi - soccer player
 Florencia Habif -  field hockey player
 Omar Hasan - rugby union footballer
 Claudio Husaín - soccer player
 Darío Husaín - soccer player
 Sebastian Jabif - volleyball player
 Betina Jozami - retired tennis player
 Antonio Mohamed - retired soccer player
 Daniel Mustafa -  soccer player

Education and science
 Hugo Omar Seleme - political philosopher

See also
Arab Argentine
List of Lebanese people
List of Lebanese people (Diaspora)

References

Argentina
Lebanese

Lebanese